Scopula pratana is a moth of the  family Geometridae. It is found in North Africa, the Canary Islands, the Near East and Yemen.

Subspecies
Scopula pratana pratana (North Africa)
Scopula pratana baezi  Hausmann, 2004 (Canary Islands)
Scopula pratana mortuaria  (Staudinger, 1898) (Palestine)
Scopula pratana occidens  (Prout, 1935)
Scopula pratana oppressa  (Walker, 1870) (Yemen)

References

Moths described in 1794
pratana
Insects of the Arabian Peninsula
Moths of Africa
Moths of Asia